What Everybody Wants is a 1954 novel by the British writer Walter Greenwood. It is the second of a trilogy set in the fictional fishing port of Treeloe in Cornwall during the postwar years. While the principal character of the first novel Randy Jollifer reappears, there is a shift to focus on the life of Darky Durrant. Durrant is a local poacher of gypsy heritage who, despite a distinguished war record as a commando, lives on the margins of society.

References

Bibliography
 Hopkins, Chris. Walter Greenwood's Love on the Dole: Novel, Play, Film. Oxford University Press, 2018.

1954 British novels
Novels by Walter Greenwood
Novels set in Cornwall
Hutchinson (publisher) books